Hills and Dales is a home rule-class city in Jefferson County, Kentucky, United States. The population was 142 at the 2010 census.

Geography
Interstate 71 runs along the southern border of the community, but with no direct access. U.S. Route 42 passes through the northwest corner of the community, leading southwest  to downtown Louisville.

Demographics

As of the census of 2000, there were 153 people, 61 households, and 51 families residing in the city. The racial makeup of the city was 96.08% White, 2.61% Asian, and 1.31% from two or more races.

There were 61 households, out of which 29.5% had children under the age of 18 living with them, 83.6% were married couples living together, and 14.8% were non-families. 9.8% of all households were made up of individuals, and 6.6% had someone living alone who was 65 years of age or older. The average household size was 2.51 and the average family size was 2.69.

In the city, the population was spread out, with 20.3% under the age of 18, 2.6% from 18 to 24, 18.3% from 25 to 44, 37.3% from 45 to 64, and 21.6% who were 65 years of age or older. The median age was 52 years. For every 100 females, there were 91.3 males. For every 100 females age 18 and over, there were 93.7 males.

The median income for a household in the city was $80,773, and the median income for a family was $80,888. Males had a median income of $66,250 versus $43,000 for females. The per capita income for the city was $43,722. About 8.7% of families and 4.8% of the population were below the poverty line, including none of those under the age of eighteen and 10.0% of those 65 or over.

References

Cities in Kentucky
Cities in Jefferson County, Kentucky
Louisville metropolitan area
Populated places established in 1976
1976 establishments in Kentucky